The Snowy Mountain Fire Observation Station is a  steel-frame  fire lookout tower on Snowy Mountain at Indian Lake in the Adirondack Mountains of New York.

It was built in 1917 as a  prefabricated LS40 tower made by the Aermotor Windmill Company.  Following the growth of surrounding trees, four more flights of stairs were added in 1933. With the advent of aerial detection, this tower was closed in 1971. It was added to the National Register of Historic Places in 2001.

It has been restored by the New York State Department of Environmental Conservation and local volunteers, and open to the public.

References

Government buildings on the National Register of Historic Places in New York (state)
Government buildings completed in 1917
Towers completed in 1917
Civilian Conservation Corps in New York (state)
Buildings and structures in Hamilton County, New York
Fire lookout towers in Adirondack Park
Fire lookout towers on the National Register of Historic Places in New York (state)
National Register of Historic Places in Hamilton County, New York